Charles Sherborn may refer to:

 Charles Davies Sherborn (1861–1942), English bibliographer, paleontologist and geologist
 Charles William Sherborn (1831–1916), English engraver